Archie Blackowl was a Cheyenne painter from Oklahoma who played a pivotal role in mid-20th century Native American art. "Leave a mark. Put something down so that when the young people see it they will understand." –Archie Blackowl, July, 1975

Background
Archie Blackowl was born in Custer County, Oklahoma, on November 23, 1911. Indigenous artists, such as Blackowl, grew up being sensitive to nature. Archie's culture made him sensitive to natural textures, which created a traditional Indian school of painting (much like the Kiowa art movement from Oklahoma). This included flat shaded native images and was an encouraged style in art competitions (Oklahoma 1946). For the public, it encompassed a "real Indian art" which Archie helped to contribute to. Though some scholars say this is the only legitimate art, it proved to be a unique piece of a large mosaic of art.

Education
In 1918 Archie Blackowl was placed into an Indian boarding school by the American government. He has this to say about his experience: "When I was about seven years old they took me to this damn Indian school of the government's and we had to stand in line and they cut my hair off. They just cut my braids off and threw them into a box with all the other children's braids. y old grandmother went over there and tgot them and my grand folks stayed at the winter camp all winter to be near me... It was hard being an Indian in them days. Later I learned to be proud." - The Indians in Oklahoma  Blackowl, was educated at Haskell Indian Nations University, studied under Olle Nordmark. Blackowl was a muralist and studio painter, who began painting actively and professionally in the early 1930s. He was commissioned to paint a mural in The Palmer House, a hotel in Chicago, Illinois.

Life
Archie Blackowl had many occupations including teacher, juror at the Philbrook Indian annual, muralist, civil service employee, Walt Disney studio employee, industrial painter for the aircraft industry, and artist. Blackowl is generally considered to be one of the more important Oklahoma traditional painters.  Blackowl's work captures the traditional Southern Plains culture and life.  His paintings, generally in tempera or mixed media, depict scenes of dancers or ceremonies in the Flat style of the Dorothy Dunn school or Bacone style of painting. Blackowl was best known for his stylized dancers adorned with traditional regalia and lack of backgrounds, as well as works upon the unforgiving blackboard.  Blackowl's devotion to traditional style flat painting earned him the honor of "Living Legend," by Ralph Oliver in 1990, as referenced in "Biographical Directory of Native American Painters," by Patrick D. Lester.

Blackowl has inspired many contemporary artists across the United States. His art is a legacy to which many young Native artists look to for information of tradition and technical skills.

Career and honors
Private collectors encouraged Indian artists to submit their artwork to competitions. Bernard Frazier sent letters to his friends and Indian artists, teachers, and students to recognize art that could be submitted to the Philbrook Indian Annual (which was an art show that helped develop the 20th century Native American fine art along with its history and impact). Before the 1946 Philbrook Indian Annual, Frazier wrote to Blackowl and asked him to "do Blackout and Philbrook a favor by painting some very big, very good Cheyenne scenes which can be entered in the competition". Blackowl was later a juror at the show and helped the Native American art scene by building a cultural bridge to the Native American people and art shows. Blackowl's works are included in such museum collections as the Gilcrease Museum in Tulsa, Oklahoma, the Millicent Rogers Museum in Taos, New Mexico, and the Sequoyah Research Center in Little Rock, Arkansas.  Blackowl's work is also in many private collections nationwide.

Public collections
Blackowl's work can be found in the following public art collections:
Oklahoma State Art Collection
Sam Noble Museum
American Indian Arts
Pierson Gallery of America Fine Art
Mutual Art

Death
Archie Blackowl died on September 15, 1992, in Stillwater, Oklahoma. He was survived by ten children.

References

1911 births
1992 deaths
Native American painters
Cheyenne people
Artists from Oklahoma
20th-century American painters
American male painters
Native American male artists
20th-century American male artists